The Singrauli–Patna  Express is an Express train belonging to East Central Railway zone that runs between  and  in India. It is currently being operated with 13349/13350 train numbers on a daily basis.

Service

The 23347/Singrauli–Patna  Express has an average speed of 36 km/hr and covers 469 km in 13h 10m. The 23348/Patna–Singrauli Express has an average speed of 36 km/hr and covers 469 km in 13h 10m.

Route and halts 

The important halts of the train are:

Coach composition

The train has standard ICF rakes with max speed of 110 kmph. The train consists of 9 coaches:

 1 AC III Tier
 2 Sleeper coaches
 5 General Unreserved
 2 Seating cum Luggage Rake

Traction

Both trains are hauled by a Patratu Loco Shed-based WDM-3A diesel locomotive from Singrauli to Chopan. From Chopan, train is hauled by a Mughal Sarai Loco Shed-based WAP-4 or WAM-4 electric locomotive to Garhwa Road, and vice versa.

Rake sharing

The train was attached to 13347/13348 Palamu Express at Garhwa Road Junction earlier. But now it does not attach with Palamu Express at Garhwa Road Junction

Direction reversal

The train reverses its direction 2 times:

See also 

 Singrauli railway station
 Patna Junction railway station

Notes

References

External links 

 23347/Singrauli–Patna Link Express India Rail Info
 23348/Patna–Singrauli Link Express India Rail Info

Transport in Patna
Express trains in India
Rail transport in Madhya Pradesh
Rail transport in Uttar Pradesh
Rail transport in Jharkhand
Rail transport in Bihar
Singrauli